Peter John Denyer (20 August 1947 – 18 September 2009) was an English actor who played Dennis Dunstable in London Weekend Television's Please Sir!, and its spin-off series The Fenn Street Gang, taking on the role of a teenager when already into his 20s. He also appeared in the film versions of Please Sir! (1971) and Never Mind the Quality, Feel the Width (1973), and the glam rock film Never Too Young to Rock (1976).

Another semi-regular role, again for LWT, was as one half of a gay couple in Agony.

He played the boring, jilted Ralph Dring in Dear John. Noted for his motor-cycle combination and 'mobile discothèque'  with one record - Green Door by Shakin' Stevens

He also appeared in Dixon of Dock Green, Moody and Pegg, and the TV soap opera Emmerdale Farm. Later in his career he moved into producing, directing and writing pantomime.

Denyer, who was unmarried, died in September 2009 in Cheltenham, aged 62.

Filmography

Discography

1973 - Just Another Minute https://www.youtube.com/watch?v=fLCZ98VJeEM</ref>

References

External links
 
 Peter Denyer at iannounce
 Obituary in The Independent
 Obituary in The Stage
 Obituary in The Times
 

1947 births
2009 deaths
English male soap opera actors
Male actors from Kent
People from Cheltenham
People from Dartford